Clive Junior Atwell (born 11 November 1988) is a Guyanese former professional boxer who competed from 2010 to 2015 and challenged for the WBC featherweight title in 2014. As an amateur he won a bronze medal at the 2007 Pan American Games as a bantamweight.

Amateur career
Atwell won gold at the Caribbean Amateur Boxing Association championships in Trinidad in 2006 and the bronze medal at the 2007 Pan American Games in the Bantamweight category.

Professional career
His debut professional fight was 29 January 2010, where he defeated Carlton Skeete.  Atwell challenged for his first world title on May 24, 2014 against WBC Featherweight champion Jhonny González, but lost by tenth-round technical decision. 

He fought Kye Mc Kenzie for the Interim PABA super featherweight title in Melbourne, Australia, but lost and was hospitalized after the fight, His next win was against Jamaican Sakima Mullings on 21 February  2015, for the super lightweight CABOFE WBC title. 

In October 2015, during a match for the FECARBOX World Boxing Council’s (WBC) lightweight title against Dexter Gonzales, Atwell fainted during the match. He was immediately hospitalized and later went to the US for corrective cranial surgery effectively ending his boxing career.

Professional boxing record

References

External links
 

1988 births
Living people
Boxers at the 2007 Pan American Games
Pan American Games bronze medalists for Guyana
Featherweight boxers
Super-featherweight boxers
Lightweight boxers
Light-welterweight boxers
Guyanese male boxers
Pan American Games medalists in boxing
Medalists at the 2007 Pan American Games